Abra Granada is a volcanic complex in the Puna de Atacama in Bolivia. Deposits erupted 7.9-5.0 mya by this volcano overlie the older Granada ignimbrite. Individual volcanic centres are known as Cerro Caucani, Cerro Granada and Cerro Solterío. The Pirquitas mine is part of the volcanic complex.

Other peraluminous rocks were erupted 10 mya. The complex is the likely source of the Granada Ignimbrite. The ignimbrite reaches its maximum thickness in the complex.

References

Further reading

Volcanoes of Bolivia
Polygenetic volcanoes
Miocene lava domes